Di-rect is a rock band from The Hague, the Netherlands, which was formed in 1999. The current line-up consists of Jamie Westland (drums), Frans "Spike" van Zoest (guitar), Bas van Wageningen (bass), Paul Jan Bakker (guitar) and Marcel Veenendaal (lead vocals).

History

1999–2000: Formation
Di-rect began in October 1999 when 15-year-old Jamie Westland asked his father Dick to help him set up a band. Three other teenagers joined him, the oldest 19 with Tim Akkerman as a frontman. Within a few months Di-rect had completed a five track demo which included the song "Just the Way I Do". 3FM radio DJ Rob Stenders saw them play live and was impressed by them. He played a song from their demo on national radio, and this generated considerable interest by record companies. Two months later Di-rect signed with Dino Music/EMI.

2001–2004: Chart success
In 2001 they released a single of "Just the Way I Do" followed by their debut album Discover. The album reached the top 100, with three further singles "My Generation" (a The Who cover), "Inside my Head" and "Free" charting in the Dutch top 40.

In February 2002 the band received a Hitkrant award for Best Dutch Rock Act and in April they were nominated for four TMF awards. They were also invited to appear at the Pinkpop and Parkpop festivals.

In January 2003 their debut album Discover turned gold, and a few weeks later the band got an Edison award for best single 2002 ("Inside My Head"). In April 2003, before the release of their second album Over the Moon, Di-rect released 2 singles: "Adrenaline" and "She". "Adrenaline" became a top 10 hit in the Netherlands and "She" reached 2nd place in the charts. Just before the release of Over the moon, Di-rect received 2 TMF awards, for Best Rock Act and Best Video (for "Adrenaline"). The album went gold in the Netherlands. In the summer of 2003 the band gained an advertising deal with Pepsi and later that year they released a single called "Name of the Game" in cooperation with Pepsi. Two further singles from their second album also reached the top 40; "Rollercoaster" and "Don't Kill me Tonight". In April 2004 they received another TMF award for best video clip for "Rollercoaster".

2005–2008: All Systems Go! and Di-rect
In January 2005 they released a third album, All Systems Go!, which entered the Dutch album chart at #1. The first single from the album "Hungry for Love" (a cover of the song by Alistair Griffin) reached #3 in the singles chart. Two further singles, "Cool Without You" and "Webcam Girl", also reached the top 10, and "Blind for You", featuring the classical pianist Wibi Soerjadi made #13. "Webcam Girl" was released in 2 parts and also featured live versions of the other two singles which were performed at Pinkpop 2005. In 2006 a cover of "Cool Without You" by German singer Tobias Regner was recorded for the soundtrack of the movie Open Season (Jagdfieber).

Following a tour of Italy and Indonesia they spent 3 weeks in the United States for the Dutch MTV show Road Rally, a game in which they raced another band, Nailpin, across the country from the west to the east coast without any spending money.

In February 2006, Di-rect signed a 2 record deal with EMI. In June, they performed at the Parkpop festival at The Hague.

On February 3, 2007, the band's lead singer at the time, Akkerman, had a daughter. On April 9, Di-rect released a new single called "A Good Thing", from the self-titled album Di-rect. The album which was released in early March and another single "I Just Can't Stand" (released May 7) both failed to chart and did not achieve any measurable success or sales.

In 2008, Di-rect was approached by Jan Rot for doing a theatre tour performing Tommy, the rock opera by The Who. Di-rect, being huge Who fans, were sceptical because the lyrics were translated to Dutch. They found Jan Rot made an excellent translation and thus started the project "Di-rect doet Tommy" (Di-rect does Tommy).

2009: Change of frontman
In March 2009, Tim Akkerman announced that he would leave Di-rect. On November 8, in the live finale of the nationally televised BNN program Wie is Direct? (English: Who is Di-rect?), the band made a unanimous decision to bring on Marcel Veenendaal from Arnhem as their new lead vocalist and frontman. The band's single "Times Are Changing" was also debuted with Marcel fronting the band for the first time in his official role as the new lead singer for Di-rect. The band also revealed via their website, that Vince van Reeken would also be joining the band in a permanent capacity on the keyboards.

Discography

Albums
Studio albums

Live albums

Joint albums

Singles

Others
2005: "Als je iets kan doen" (in formation Artiesten voor Azië) (NED: #1)

Notes

References

External links
Di-rect official website
Di-rect doet Tommy official website

Dutch rock music groups